"My Fist Your Face" is a song from hard rock band Aerosmith's eighth album Done with Mirrors. It was the second track on the album. It was released as a promo-only 12-inch single to US radio stations in 1985, the third promo-only single taken from the album.

Track listing
12" vinyl (promo):
"My Fist Your Face" - 4:21

Personnel
Aerosmith
Tom Hamilton - bass
Joey Kramer - drums
Joe Perry - guitar, backing vocals
Steven Tyler - lead vocals, harmonica, piano
Brad Whitford - guitar

Other personnel
Ted Templeman - producer

References

Aerosmith songs
1985 singles
Song recordings produced by Ted Templeman
Geffen Records singles
Songs written by Steven Tyler
Songs written by Joe Perry (musician)
1985 songs